The 47th Annual Tony Awards was broadcast by CBS from the Gershwin Theatre in New York City on June 6, 1993. The host was Liza Minnelli.

The ceremony
The theme of the ceremony was to commemorate the 100th anniversary of theatre in Times Square, and the telecast opened with a new song, "Celebrate Broadway."  The musical presentation was a "Sisters Medley" with sisters Liza Minnelli and Lorna Luft. The finale was Oklahoma!, with 1993 Tony Award winners and Company.

Presenters: Bea Arthur, Tom Bosley, Matthew Broderick, Ellen Burstyn, Diahann Carroll, Michael Crawford, Tyne Daly, Tammy Grimes, Marvin Hamlisch, Julie Harris, Gregory Hines, James Earl Jones, Agnes de Mille, Amanda Plummer, Jonathan Pryce, Mercedes Ruehl, Ron Silver, Lily Tomlin, Tommy Tune, Ben Vereen.

Performers: Barry Bostwick, Liza Minnelli, Bill Irwin, David Shiner, and cast members from Cats; Crazy For You; Falsettos, Guys and Dolls; Jelly's Last Jam; The Will Rogers Follies.

Musicals and Plays represented:

 Blood Brothers (Medley - Company);
 The Goodbye Girl  ("Paula" - Bernadette Peters and Martin Short);
 Kiss of the Spider Woman - The Musical ("Where You Are" - Brent Carver, Chita Rivera and Company);
 The Who's Tommy (Medley - Company);
 Angels in America: Millennium Approaches (Scene with Ron Leibman and Kathleen Chalfant);
 The Sisters Rosensweig (Scene with Jane Alexander, Madeline Kahn and Robert Klein);
 Someone Who'll Watch Over Me (Scene with Michael York and David Dukes);
 The Song of Jacob Zulu (Scene with K. Todd Freeman).

Award winners and nominees
Winners are in bold

Special awards
Regional Theatre Award - La Jolla Playhouse
Special Tony Award - Oklahoma! (50th Anniversary)
Tony Honor 
IATSE (International Alliance of Theatrical Stage Employees)
Broadway Cares/Equity Fights AIDS

Multiple nominations and awards

These productions had multiple nominations:

11 nominations: Kiss of the Spider Woman and The Who's Tommy 
9 nominations: Angels in America: Millennium Approaches 
6 nominations: Blood Brothers and The Song of Jacob Zulu
5 nominations: Anna Christie, The Goodbye Girl and The Sisters Rosensweig 
4 nominations: Anna Karenina
3 nominations: My Favorite Year and Redwood Curtain
2 nominations: Someone Who'll Watch Over Me 

The following productions received multiple awards.

7 wins: Kiss of the Spider Woman
5 wins: The Who's Tommy
4 wins: Angels in America: Millennium Approaches

See also
 Drama Desk Awards
 1993 Laurence Olivier Awards – equivalent awards for West End theatre productions
 Obie Award
 New York Drama Critics' Circle
 Theatre World Award
 Lucille Lortel Awards

External links
Official Site Tony Awards

Tony Awards ceremonies
1993 in theatre
1993 theatre awards
Tony
1993 in New York City